A Stranger is Watching is a 1982 American horror film directed by Sean S. Cunningham. The screenplay was written by Earl Mac Rauch and Victor Miller, based on the 1977 novel of the same name by Mary Higgins Clark.

Plot 
Steve Peterson's wife, Nina is murdered in front of their young daughter Julie. Three years later, Julie and Peterson's new girlfriend Sharon Martin are kidnapped by the same killer, the psychotic Artie Taggart. Taggart imprisons them in a bunker below Grand Central Station, throwing the police into a race against time to save the girl.

Cast 
 Kate Mulgrew as Sharon Martin
 Rip Torn as Artie Taggart
 James Naughton as Steve Peterson
 Shawn von Schreiber as Julie Peterson
 Barbara Baxley as Lally
 Stephen Joyce as Detective Taylor
 James Russo as Ronald Thompson
 Frank Hamilton as Bill Lufts
 Maggie Task as Mrs. Lufts
 Roy Poole as Walter Kurner
 Maurice Copeland as Roger Perry
 Eleanor Phelps as Glenda Perry
 Joanne Dorian as Nina Peterson
 Stephen Strimpell as Detective Marlowe
 David Allen Brooks as Big Bum
 William Hickey as Maxi
 Jennie Ventriss as Kathy Green

Critical reception 
Allmovie gave the film a mildly favorable review, writing "Sean Cunningham's first post-Friday the 13th film was shrugged off by most critics, but it is better than its reputation might lead one to believe." Janet Maslin of The New York Times thought the film is "a lot better" than  Friday the 13th, and noted: "The story offers a few surprises, and the bowels of the railway station are scenic, in their grubby way."

References

External links 
 
 
 

1982 films
1982 horror films
1980s American films
1980s English-language films
1980s horror thriller films
1980s serial killer films
American horror thriller films
American serial killer films
Films about kidnapping
Films based on American novels
Films based on mystery novels
Films directed by Sean S. Cunningham
Films scored by Lalo Schifrin
Films set in New York City
Films set on the New York City Subway
Films shot in New York City
Films with screenplays by Victor Miller (writer)
Metro-Goldwyn-Mayer films
United Artists films